Sagartia is a genus of sea anemones in the family Sagartiidae. The genus was first described by Philip Henry Gosse in 1855 and the image is his painting of several species found in British waters included in his book, A history of the British sea-anemones and corals.

Species
The following species are recognised:

Sagartia alba (Cocks in Johnston, 1847)
Sagartia albovirdis Kirk & Stuckey, 1909
Sagartia capensis Pax, 1922
Sagartia carcinophila Verrill, 1869
Sagartia catalinensis McPeak, 1968
Sagartia crispata Verrill, 1869
Sagartia elegans (Dalyell, 1848)
Sagartia hastata Wright, 1859
Sagartia ichthystoma Gosse, 1858
Sagartia lessonii (Lesson, 1830)
Sagartia minima Pax, 1922
Sagartia napensis (Stimpson, 1856)
Sagartia nigropunctata (Stimpson, 1856)
Sagartia nymphaea (Drayton in Dana, 1846)
Sagartia ornata (Holdsworth, 1855)
Sagartia problematica Pax, 1922
Sagartia rhododactylos (Grube, 1840)
Sagartia rockalliensis Carlgren, 1924
Sagartia rubroalba (Quoy & Gaimard, 1833)
Sagartia sobolescens Gravier, 1918
Sagartia sociabilis Gravier, 1918
Sagartia splendens Danielssen, 1890
Sagartia troglodytes (Price in Johnston, 1847)

References

Sagartiidae
Hexacorallia genera
Taxa named by Philip Henry Gosse